Jamal Avery Jones (born February 17, 1993) is an American professional basketball player for Dinamo Sassari of the Italian Lega Basket Serie A (LBA). He played college basketball at Ole Miss and Texas A&M.

Early life and high school
Jones was born in Wynne, Arkansas and grew up in Searcy, Arkansas, where he attended Searcy High School. After growing seven inches from 6-1 to 6-8 over three years, Jones averaged 16.4 points, seven rebounds, two assists and two steals as a junior and was ranked a three-star recruit by Rivals.com. He committed to Ole Miss over offers from Arkansas State and Iowa State during his senior year.

College career

Ole Miss
Jones began his collegiate career at Ole Miss, but was dismissed from the team after appearing in only five games for violating undisclosed team rules.

Lee
Following his dismissal, Jones enrolled at Lee College in Baytown, Texas. He averaged 18 points and 5.3 rebounds in his only season with the Runnin' Rebels and ultimately committed to transfer to Texas A&M.

Texas A&M
Jones averaged a team-leading 13.4 points and 4.1 rebounds in 34 games (24 starts) in his junior season with the Aggies and averaged 16 points per game in Southeastern Conference play. Following the season he announced that he would be leaving the program.

Professional career

Delaware 87ers (first stint)
After initially considering transferring for his final year of NCAA eligibility, Jones ultimately decided to end his collegiate career and move on to the NBA Development League. Jones was selected in the second round of the 2014 NBA Development League draft by the Delaware 87ers. In his first professional season, Jones averaged 7.8 points and 2.9 rebounds in 21.1 minutes in 46 games.

Lille Métropole
After going unselected in the 2015 NBA draft and a stint playing for the 76ers Summer League team, Jones ultimately decided to leave the 76ers organization for options overseas instead of a second D-League season. He signed with Lille Métropole of the French Second Division on August 3, 2015. he averaged 13.1 points, 4.9 rebounds, and 1.9 assists in 18 games before leaving the team to return to the 87ers.

Delaware 87ers (second stint)
Jones returned to the 87ers and finished the 2016 season with the team, playing in 13 games (one start) and averaging 5.4 points and 1.6 rebounds per game. He was selected by the Windy City Bulls in the 10th round of the 2016 NBA Development League Expansion draft, but opted again to play overseas instead of in the D-League. Windy City traded his overseas return rights to the Northern Arizona Suns on October 29, 2016.

Kobrat
Jones signed with Kobrat of the Finnish Korisliiga on August 11, 2016. He led the league in scoring by averaging 21.5 points per game along 5.6 rebounds, 1.8 assists and 1.2 steals in 39 contests.

Scaligera Basket Verona
Jones signed with Scaligera Basket Verona of Serie A2 Basket on July 9, 2017. He averaged 14 points, 4.2 rebounds, and 2.2 assists per game in 36 games with the team.

PAOK
Jones signed with PAOK of the Greek Basket League (GBL) on July 4, 2018. He suffered damage to the cartilage in his right knee early March, 2019 that required season-ending surgery. He averaged 6.5 points in 12 Basketball Champions League games and 7.7 points with 3.1 rebounds in 13 GBL games.

Ionikos Nikaias
Jones opted to stay in Greece for the 2019-2020 season and signed with Ionikos Nikaias on June 25, 2019. Jones averaged 13.7 points, 5.2 rebounds and 2.1 assists in 15 games played before leaving the team in January 2020.

Bahçeşehir Koleji
On January 16, 2020, Jones officially signed with Turkish club Bahçeşehir Koleji. He averaged 8.1 points, 4.4 rebounds and 2.1 assists in seven Turkish League games and 13.8 points, 6.4 rebounds, 2.6 assists and 1.0 blocks per game in five Europe Cup games. Jones re-signed with Bahçeşehir for the 2020–21 season.

Bahçeşehir Koleji
On June 19, 2022, he has signed with Dinamo Sassari of the Italian Lega Basket Serie A (LBA).

References

External links
Texas A&M Aggies bio
RealGM profile
EuroBasket profile

1993 births
Living people
American expatriate basketball people in Finland
American expatriate basketball people in France
American expatriate basketball people in Greece
American expatriate basketball people in Italy
American expatriate basketball people in Turkey
American men's basketball players
Bahçeşehir Koleji S.K. players
Basketball players from Arkansas
Delaware 87ers players
Dinamo Sassari players
Ionikos Nikaias B.C. players
Junior college men's basketball players in the United States
Kobrat players
Lee College (Texas) alumni
Lille Métropole BC players
Ole Miss Rebels men's basketball players
P.A.O.K. BC players
People from Wynne, Arkansas
Scaligera Basket Verona players
Shooting guards
Small forwards
Texas A&M Aggies men's basketball players